In rail transport, the expression power car may refer to either of two distinct types of rail vehicle:

a vehicle that propels, and commonly also controls, a passenger train, multiple unit or tram, often as the lead vehicle; 
a vehicle equipped with machinery for supplying heat or electrical power to other parts of a train.

The first of these types of vehicle is closely related to the locomotive. What differentiates the locomotive and the first type of power car is their construction or use. A locomotive can be physically separated from its train and does nothing but provide propulsion and control (and heat or electricity for passenger trains). On the other hand, a power car of the first type is frequently an integral part of its train, and if the train uses distributed traction, some of the car's interior space may be used for carrying passengers or cargo.

Examples

United States
Nearly all high speed trains use power cars, frequently at both ends. An example of these are the Acela Express trainsets in use by Amtrak, which are built by Bombardier in Canada using technology licensed from France's Alstom. The twenty Acela trainsets operate between Washington, D.C. and Boston, Massachusetts. Each trainset consists of six passenger cars and two power cars.

United Kingdom
Another traditional example would be the older InterCity 125, made for and used by British Rail and several subsequent privatised bodies like Great Western Railway.

New Zealand
Multiple units (diesel or electric) usually have a mix of power cars and trailers, often with one of each in a pair which can be coupled to other pairs to form a larger train; see e.g. New Zealand FP class electric multiple unit.

Australia 

The NSW TrainLink XPT, which is based on the InterCity 125, has a power car at each end, one pulling and the other pushing. The Queensland Rail Diesel Tilt Train also has two power cars. Electric Multiple Units, such as the Sydney Trains C set, have power cars on each end with trailer cars in the middle.

References

Rolling stock